The Wise County Courthouse is located at 206 East Main Street in downtown Wise, Virginia. As well as being home to Wise County's judicial system, it also serves as the chief administrative building for the county. It was built in 1896 to replace a much smaller court building. The original courthouse was completed in 1858, two years after the formation of Wise County, but was destroyed by Union troops during the Civil War in 1864.  The current courthouse was designed in the Renaissance style of architecture.

It was listed on the National Register of Historic Places in 1981.

See also 
National Register of Historic Places listings in Wise County, Virginia

References

County courthouses in Virginia
National Register of Historic Places in Wise County, Virginia
Wise, Virginia
Buildings and structures in Wise County, Virginia
Frank Pierce Milburn buildings
Courthouses on the National Register of Historic Places in Virginia
Government buildings completed in 1896
Clock towers in Virginia